Moses Hull (1836–1907) was a minister for the Seventh-day Adventist Church in the 19th century, who later became a Spiritualist lecturer and author.

Biography
Born in Waldo, Ohio, Hull was a member of the United Brethren Church in his teens.   He joined the Seventh-day Adventist Church in 1857, and became a prominent minister and debater for that denomination. In September 1863, Hull preached his last sermon as an Adventist minister.

Around this time, he turned most of energies towards the promotion of Spiritualism, specifically Christian Spiritualism, which saw spirit communication as the culmination of Christianity. He gained prominence in the movement for a series of debates with ministers, the outcome of which was evident in that the spiritualists rather than the ministers had the transcripts published.  
Hull became identified largely with Victoria Woodhull and the women's rights wing of the movement, which launched the Equal Rights Party campaign in 1872. Later, he became a national leader of the Greenback-Labor Party and various attempts to secure more rights for the farmers, the workers and women.

Soon after, he divorced his wife, Elvira, and married fellow spiritualist Mattie Brown Sawyer. He ran for Congress in 1906 on the ticket of the Socialist Party, and died in January 1907.

References
 Mark Lause, The Civil War’s Last Campaign: James B. Weaver, the National Greenback-Labor Party & the Politics of Race and Section. Lanham, MD: University Press of America, 2001.
 Light Bearers: A History of the Seventh-day Adventist Church, revised and updated edition, ed. Richard W. Schwarz and Floyd Greenleaf. (Nampa, Idaho: Pacific Press, 2000), p613–614
 The Cure for the Last Daze by Karl Haffner (Pacific Press, 2003), p66–67
 "The tragic story of Moses Hull" by James R. Nix. Adventist Review 164:35 (August 27, 1987), p16
 "Moses Hull's tragic story" by Jim Robertson. Cornerstone Connections 25 (July–September 1994), p78–83. Reprinted in 2002 and 2006 in the same magazine
 "A few words about greatness" by Bobbie Jane Van Dolson. Insight 7 (March 9, 1976), p18–19
 "My Uncle Moses" by Lewis R. Ogden. Advent Review and Sabbath Herald 150 (July 5, 1973), p11

External links

 Biography of Moses Hull by Daniel Hull and others 
 Moses Hull: Information and Much More from Answers.com
 Moses Hull from www.EllenWhite.info 
 NSAC.org Official website 
 Morris Pratt Institute

1836 births
1907 deaths
American Seventh-day Adventist ministers
American spiritualists
American women's rights activists
Former Seventh-day Adventists
Ohio Greenbacks
Socialist Party of America politicians from Wisconsin
19th-century American clergy